Football is the most popular sport in Tajikistan, a country that gained independence in 1991. The national association regularly takes part in competitions organised by FIFA and the Asian Football Confederation at senior and youth level. However, the country has not yet enjoyed any real success. While funds are limited, costs for travel and accommodation for international matches are prohibitively high. It is therefore extremely difficult for the national teams to gain experience, apart from in official competitions.

History of football in Tajikistan

Soviet period
Football in Tajikistan started to develop in the 1920s and the Tajikistan National Football Federation was established in 1936.
In 1937 the first championship of the Tajik SSR (i.e. the Tajik League) was held, which was composed of over 20 teams. Dynamo Stalinabad became the first champion, while Spartak Stalinabad came second and Dinamo Kirovabad came third. In the same year, Dynamo Stalinabad made its debut in the USSR Cup, where it defeated Spartak Tashkent 2–1, however lost to Lokomotiv Baku 5–0.
 
In 1938 the first Tajik Cup competition was held, in which Dynamo Stalinabad defeated Spartak Leninabad 4–0 in the final. In 1947 Dynamo, for the first time in the history of Tajik football, was represented in the national championship. Dynamo played in the Central Asian zone group three times, along with Spartak Tashkent, ODL Tashkent, Lokomotiv Ashgabat, a team from Frunze and a team from Alma-Ata. As a result, Dynamo gained 25 points and was the winner of the tournament. In September, the winners of the six zonal tournaments left for Moscow to decide the club, that in 1948 would play in the first group of the USSR championship. Unfortunately, players of Tajikistan took only fifth place. Those who played in the first republic to the national championship were B. Boyko, G. Titov, N. Meshcheryakov, A. Sokolov, F. Rukavishnikov, K. Zakharov, M. Meekin, E. Kuzmin, V. Leichenko, K. Pogorelov, AP Babich, B. Fomichev, Yu Piskunyan, N. Emelianov. 
 
The only football club from the Tajik SSR that played in the USSR Top League was SKA-Pamir Dushanbe, where they played three consecutive seasons from 1989 to 1991.

Between 1974 and 1992, several Tajik footballers were members of the USSR national football team and the CIS national football team:

Since independence
Following the civil war, Tajik League and Tajik Cup resumed in 1992. In 1994, Tajikistan National Football Federation was reestablished.

Tajikistan national football team success came in 1993, when it came third in ECO Cup, also performed well in the 1998 Asian Games where reached the second round. However, the greatest performance was champions of 2006 AFC Challenge Cup. Performance in subsequent appearances in Challenge Cup were also satisfactory, runner-up of 2008 AFC Challenge Cup and third place 2010 AFC Challenge Cup.

At youth level, Tajikistan national under-17 football team
won bronze at AFC U-17 Championship 2006 and the following year reached round-of-16 at 2007 FIFA U-17 World Championship.

Since its foundation in 2005, Tajik football teams have won or at least reached the final in AFC President's Cup apart from 2007.

National team

Tajikistan national football team qualified for the AFC Asian Cup for the first team. 2023 AFC Asian Cup is the first major tournament for Tajikistan.

Tajikistan football stadiums by capacity

See also
List of Tajikistan football transfers 2012

References

External links
 Slovari.yandex.ru